Subuliniscus arambourgi is a species of small, tropical, air-breathing land snail, a terrestrial pulmonate gastropod mollusk in the family Achatinidae. This species is endemic to Kenya.

References

Invertebrates of Kenya
Gastropods of Africa
arambourgi
Gastropods described in 1934
Taxonomy articles created by Polbot